The Oregon Book Awards are presented annually by Literary Arts to honor the "state’s finest accomplishments by Oregon writers who work in genres of poetry, fiction, graphic literature, drama, literary nonfiction, and literature for young readers."

Oregon Book Award was founded in 1987 by Brian Booth and Oregon Institute for Literary Arts (OILA). In 1993, Literary Arts, a statewide non-profit organization dedicated to enriching the lives of Oregonians through language and literature, joined with the OILA and continued to support and promote Oregon's authors with the book awards and Oregon Literary Fellowships. Award winners are selected based solely on literary merit by out-of-state judges who change each year.

In 2005 the award ceremony was moved from the Scottish Rite Center to the Wonder Ballroom, in an effort to make it more lively and fun. Since 2009, the awards ceremony has been held at the Gerding Theatre at the Armory, the home of Portland Center Stage.

Recipients

Book Awards

Stafford/Hall Award for Poetry

Award for Fiction

Ken Kesey Award for the Novel

H. L. Davis Award for Short Fiction

Ken Kesey Award for Fiction

Award for Literary Nonfiction

Frances Fuller Victor Award for General Nonfiction

Sarah Winnemucca Award for Creative Nonfiction

Angus L. Bowmer Award for Drama

Award for Young Readers Literature

Eloise Jarvis McGraw Award for Children's Literature

Leslie Bradshaw Award for Young Adult Literature

Pacific Northwest College of Art Graphic Literature Award

Readers Choice Award

Special Awards
1988: William Everson
1989: George Venn
1990: Mary Barnard
1991: Don James
1992: Paul Pintarich
1994: Ralph Friedman
1995: Wilma Erwin

Charles Erskine Scott Wood Distinguished Writer Award
1987: George Belknap
1988: Dorothy Johansen
1989: Vi Gale
1990: Janet Stevenson
1991: Walt Morey
1992: Terence O'Donnell
1993: Alvin M. Josephy, Jr.
1994: Early Pomeroy
1995: Damon Knight
1996: Eloise McGraw
1998: Priscilla Knuth
1999: Ken Kesey
2003: George Hitchcock
2006: Ursula K. Le Guin
2008: Barry Lopez
2014: Vern Rutsala
2015: Ralph Salisbury
2017: Jarold Ramsey
2020: Lawson Fusao Inada
2021: Molly Gloss

Stewart H. Holbrook Literary Legacy Award
1987: Northwest Review
1988: Calyx, A Journal of Art & Literature
1989: Katharine McCanna
1990: Sandra Williams
1991: Walt Curtis
1992: Clyde Rice
1993: Penny Avila
1994: George Venn
1995: Tom Ferte
1996: Brian Booth
1997: Ruth Gundle & Judith Barrington
1998: Dennis & Linny Stovall
1999: Peter Sears
2000: Rich Wandschneider
2001: Erik Muller
2002: Carla Perry
2003: David Hedges
2004: David Milholland
2005: Barbara LaMorticella
2006: Paulann Petersen
2007: Kim Stafford
2008: Marlene Howard
2009: Matt Love
2011: John Laursen
2013: Larry Colton
2014: Vince & Patty Wixon
2015: Tom Spanbauer
2016: Douglas Spangle
2017: The Independent Publishing Resource Center
2018: Tracey Daugherty and Marjorie Sandor
2019: José González
2020: Write Around Portland
2021: Elizabeth Lyon

Walt Morey Young Readers Literary Legacy Award
1998: Barbara J. McKillip
1999: Claudia Jones
2000: Cathy Schneider
2001: Oregon advisory boards of First Book
2002: Ready to Learn
2003: Jerry Isom
2004: Patricia R. Gallagher
2005: Carol Brown
2006: John Monteverde
2007: Mark Mizell
2008: Young Writers Association
2009: The Dove Lewis Read to the Dogs Program
2011: The Children's Book Bank
2012: Ulrich Hardt
2013: Oregon Battle of the Books
2014: Ellen Fader
2015: Jann Tankersley
2016: Curtis Kiefer
2017: The SMART (Start Making A Reader Today) Program
2018: Carmen T. Bernier-Grand
2020: Reading Results
2021: PlayWrite, Inc.

Literary Fellowships

C. Hamilton Bailey Fellowship in Poetry
2018: Matthew Minicucci
2019: Pamela K. Santos
2020: Alicia Jo Rabins
2021: Amy Miller

Edna L. Homes Fellowship in Young Readers
2018: Erica A. Briggs
2019: Amy Baskin
2020: Kelly Garrett
2021: Shana Targosz

Fellowship in Fiction
2018: Omar El Akkad and Adair V

Fellowship in Poetry
2018: manuel arturo abreu, Danielle Cadena Deulen, and Milo R. Muise

Fellowship in Publishing
2018: Clackamas Literary Review and Pacifica: Poetry International
2019: Atelier 26 Books and Opossum: A Literary Marsupial
2020: Fonograf Editions and Octopus Books
2021: Forest Avenue Press and "Northwest Review''

Fellowship in Nonfiction
2018: Elizabeth Enslin, Susan Shepard, and Brian Trapp
2019: Sterling Cunio and Justin Taylor
2020: Garet Lahvis

Laurell Swails and Donald Monroe Memorial Fellowship in Fiction
2018: Takashi L. Kendrick and Mika Tanner
2019: Ana-Maurine Lara and Chris Stuck
2020: Cynthia L. Brown and Taylor Koekkoek
2021: Pedro Hoffmeister and Emily Woodworth

Leslie Bradshaw Fellowship
2018: Alberto Yáñez (for nonfiction)
2019: Chelsea Biondolillo (for nonfiction)
2020: Rachael Carnes (for drama)
2021: Sara Jean Accuardi (for drama)

Oregon Arts Commission Fellowship
2018: Jacob Aiello and Jake Vermaas
2019: Karen Luper and Marcus Lund
2020: Marjorie Celona and Gabriel Urza

Oregon Literary Career Fellowship
2020: Beth Alvarado and Dao Strom
2021: Annie Sheppard and Sandy Tanaka

Oregon Poetry Community Fellowship
2019: Jennifer Perrine
2021: Alyssa Ogi

Walt Morey Fellowship
2018: Cindy Baldwin (for drama)
2019: Stacy Brewster (for drama)
2020: Jamie Cooper (for poetry)
2021: Scott Korb (for nonfiction)

Women Writers Fellowship
2018: Naomi Ulsted
2019: Natalie Hirt
2020: Eliza Rotterman
2021: A. M. Rosales

Writers of Color Fellowship
2018: Reema Zaman
2019: Christopher Rose
2020: Olufunke Grace Bankole
2021: Kesha Ajose-Fisher

External links
Complete list of literary award finalists and winners for all years
Complete list of literary fellowship winners for all years

References

Awards established in 1987
American fiction awards
American poetry awards
Oregon culture
Culture of Portland, Oregon